Hidden Hands of a Sadist Nation is the third full-length  studio album by American melodic death metal band Darkest Hour. It was released in 2003, and contains nine tracks on the regular release and ten for the Japanese release and the limited edition DVD. "For The Soul of the Savior" includes a solo by Kris Norris which replaces the last part of the original song. It is also the first Darkest Hour album to feature Kris Norris on lead guitar.

Music videos were released for the songs "The Sadist Nation" and "Oklahoma."

Track listing

Reception

Hidden Hands of a Sadist Nation has received mixed reviews.

Punknews gave the album a favorable review, saying "tt's hard to pinpoint what makes the record work so well; be it the much more  melodies, the constant experimentation with tempo, the ability to combine such diverse heavy influences coherently, or the reluctance to fall into genre traps, this is an outstanding heavy record and will hopefully be the record to show that clever, original metal can be produced on this side of the Atlantic."

Richie Unterberger of AllMusic gave the album a negative review. Unterberger stated John Henry's vocals "crosses well beyond the bounds of (presumably unconscious) self-parody" and criticized the album's length. The review did have some praise for closing track "Veritas, Aequitas" for its inclusion of piano and acoustic guitar, saying it comes "as nothing less than a total shock after the mayhem of the preceding eight tracks. If it's a joke, it's one the bandmembers should take seriously; they're really underselling themselves if they're capable of playing in a more versatile range of any sort, but elect not to by choice."

DVD
After its release, Victory Records reissued Hidden Hands of a Sadist Nation with a bonus DVD. It includes an alternate music video to "The Sadist Nation," footage from both recording and from their past tours, as well as a bonus video with tour manager Tito Picon.

Personnel 
 John Henry – vocals
 Kris Norris – lead guitar
 Mike Schleibaum – rhythm guitar
 Paul Burnette – bass
 Ryan Parrish – drums

References

Darkest Hour (band) albums
2003 albums
Victory Records albums
Albums produced by Fredrik Nordström